Peter Sydney Cullen (24 August 1932 – October 2010) was a British athlete. He competed in the men's javelin throw at the 1956 Summer Olympics. He also represented England in the javelin at the 1958 British Empire and Commonwealth Games in Cardiff, Wales.

References

1932 births
2010 deaths
Athletes (track and field) at the 1956 Summer Olympics
Athletes (track and field) at the 1958 British Empire and Commonwealth Games
British male javelin throwers
English male javelin throwers
Olympic athletes of Great Britain
Sportspeople from Lincoln, England
Commonwealth Games competitors for England